The Street (Swedish: Gatan) is a 1949 Swedish drama film directed by Gösta Werner and starring Maj-Britt Nilsson, Peter Lindgren and  Keve Hjelm. It was shot at the Centrumateljéerna Studios in Stockholm and on location in the city. The film's sets were designed by the art director P.A. Lundgren.

Synopsis
A young woman is knocked down in a Stockholm street by a vehicle and is taken to hospital. While under anaesthetic she hallucinates about the events that have led up to the accident.

Cast

 Maj-Britt Nilsson as 	Britt Malm
 Peter Lindgren as Bertil 'Berra' Wiring
 Keve Hjelm as 	Rudolf 'Rulle' Malm
 Naemi Briese as 	Vera 'Gullan' Karlsson
 Stig Järrel as 	Staff Manager Sven Andreasson
 Åke Fridell as 	Gustaf Persson
 Marianne Löfgren as 	Elin Persson
 Per Oscarsson as 	Åke Rodelius
 Göran Gentele as 	Göte
 Mimi Pollak as 	Mrs. Rodelius
 Ragnar Arvedson as Consul Rodelius
 Arne Källerud as 	Harry
 Julia Cæsar as 	Mrs. Blomqvist
 Wiktor Andersson as 	Skipper
 Svea Holst as 	Anna Andreasson 
 Björn Berglund as 	Dr. Linell
 Sif Ruud as 	Mrs. Bergman 
 Börje Mellvig as 	Chief Constable
 Julie Bernby as 	Cashier 
 Brita Borg as 	Singer
 Bernt Callenbo as Errand Boy 
 Mary Rapp as 	Prostitute
 Fylgia Zadig as 	Prostitute 
 Torsten Lilliecrona as Undercover Police Officer 
 Rune Stylander as 	Undercover Police Officer 
 Barbro Flodquist as 	Vera's Neighbour 
 Tom Walter as 	Rulle's Neighbour 
 Vera Lindby as 	Woman at Hotel
 John Zacharias as 	Rulle's Colleague
 Nils Hallberg as 	Man Outside Hot Dog Stand 
 Anna-Greta Krigström as 	Girl in Boat 
 Öllegård Wellton as 	Young Woman at Train Station 
 Lissi Alandh as 	Woman at Restaurant
 Emmy Albiin as Woman Selling Flowers

References

Bibliography 
 Qvist, Per Olov & von Bagh, Peter. Guide to the Cinema of Sweden and Finland. Greenwood Publishing Group, 2000.

External links 
 

1949 films
Swedish drama films
1949 drama films
1940s Swedish-language films
Films directed by Gösta Werner
Swedish black-and-white films
1940s Swedish films